Robert, Rob, Bob, or Bobby Thomas may refer to:

Arts
 Robert Thomas (director) (1927–1989), French writer, actor and director
 Robert Thomas (sculptor) (1926–1999), Welsh sculptor
 Robert Thomas Jr., American jazz percussionist and hand drummer
 Robert Thomas, former bassist for the rock band Black Veil Brides
 Rob Thomas (musician) (born 1972), lead singer of Matchbox Twenty
 Rob Thomas (writer) (born 1965), producer and screenwriter, creator of Veronica Mars
 Bobby Thomas (musician) (1932–2013), American jazz drummer
 Bob Thomas (actor) (born 1965), radio personality, actor, and writer
 Bob Thomas, founder member of Silly Wizard

Journalism
 Robert Thomas (newspaper proprietor) (1781–1860), founder of the South Australian Register
 Robert McG. Thomas Jr. (1939–2000), American journalist 
 Robert Kyffin Thomas (1851–1910), South Australian newspaper proprietor
 Robert Bailey Thomas, American publisher of the Old Farmers Almanac
 Bob Thomas (reporter) (1922–2014), American reporter for the AP covering Hollywood
 Rob Thomas, American newspaper editor The Capital Times

Politics
 Sir Robert Thomas, 1st Baronet (1873–1951), Liberal Member of Parliament in Wales
 Sir Robert Thomas, 2nd Baronet (1622–?), MP for Cardiff, 1661–1681
 Robert J. Thomas (1945–2014), president and CEO of Nissan in the U.S. and Clinton Administration appointee
 Lindsay Thomas (politician) (Robert Lindsay Thomas, born 1943), US Representative from Georgia
 Robert R. Thomas (born 1952), Chief Justice of the Illinois Supreme Court, former NFL kicker
 Robert Y. Thomas Jr. (1859–1925), US Representative from Kentucky
 Bob Thomas (Nevada politician) (1926–2013), American businessman, newspaper columnist, and politician
 Bob Thomas (Australian politician) (1954–2016), Western Australian politician
 Bob Thomas (Virginia politician) (1977-), Member of the Virginia House of Delegates

Sports
 Bob Thomas (running back) (born 1948), American football player
 Robert Thomas (fullback) (born 1974), Arena Football League player, formerly of the Dallas Cowboys
 Robert Thomas (linebacker) (born 1980), American football player
 Robert Thomas (defensive lineman) (born 1991), American football player
 Robert Thomas (ice hockey) (born 1999), Canadian ice hockey player
 Rob Thomas (rugby league) (born 1990), English rugby league footballer
 Robb Thomas (born 1966), American football player
 Bob Thomas (rugby union) (1871–1910), Wales international rugby player
 Bob Thomas (footballer, born 1919) (1919–1990), English football player
 Bob Thomas (Irish footballer), Irish football (soccer) player and manager
 Bob Thomas (long jumper) (1939–2016), New Zealand long jumper
 Bobby Thomas (cyclist) (1912–2008), American Olympic cyclist
 Bobby Thomas (footballer) (born 2001), English footballer

Other
 Robert Thomas (Ap Vychan) (1809–1880), known by the bardic name "Ap Vychan", a Welsh Independent minister and poet
 Robert K. Thomas (literary scholar) (1918–1998), English professor and academic vice president at BYU
 Robert K. Thomas (chemist) (born 1941), physical chemist
 Robert M. Thomas (1908–1984), American rubber scientist
 Robert George Thomas (1820–1883), draftsman and architect in the British colony of South Australia
 Robert Jermain Thomas (1839–1866), Christian missionary in Korea
 Rob Thomas (scientist), South Australian environmental scientist and public servant
 Robert Thomas, 18th-century British counterfeiter, see Cragg Coiners
 Bob Thomas (programmer), creator of the computer worm Creeper

See also
 Rod Thomas (disambiguation)
 Roy Thomas (disambiguation)